NE-CHMIMO (CHM-018) is an indole-based synthetic cannabinoid that is presumed to be a potent agonist of the CB1 receptor and has been sold online as a designer drug. NE-CHMIMO is the 1-cyclohexylmethyl (instead of 1-pentyl) analogue of the first-generation synthetic cannabinoid JWH-018. The corresponding cyclohexylmethyl derivative of JWH-081 had also been reported several months earlier.

Legal status

In the United States, all CB1 receptor agonists of the 3-(1-naphthoyl)indole class such as NE-CHMIMO are Schedule I Controlled Substances.

NE-CHMIMO is a controlled substance in Japan as of November 2019.

See also

References 

Designer drugs
Naphthoylindoles
CB1 receptor agonists